Loopback device may refer to:
 Loopback, related to electronic communication interfaces
 Loop device, a pseudo-device in Unix-like operating systems